The Hume-Williams Baronetcy, of Ewhurst in the County of Surrey, was a title in the Baronetage of the United Kingdom. It was created on 28 November 1922 for the barrister and Conservative politician Sir Ellis Hume-Williams. The title became extinct on the death of the second Baronet in 1980.

Hume-Williams baronets, of Ewhurst (1922)
Sir Ellis William Hume-Williams, 1st Baronet (1863–1947)
Sir Roy Ellis Hume-Williams, 2nd Baronet (1887–1980)

References

Extinct baronetcies in the Baronetage of the United Kingdom